Rachel Oliver (born 24 July 1971) is an association football player who represented New Zealand.

Oliver made her Football Ferns in a 0–0 draw with Korea Republic on 8 September 1995, and finished her international career with 22 caps to her credit.

References

1971 births
Living people
New Zealand women's international footballers
New Zealand women's association footballers
Women's association footballers not categorized by position